Teknologföreningen is the only student nation at the Aalto University. The only other university in Finland hosting student nations is the University of Helsinki. The Aalto University was formed in 2010 by a merger of three universities, before the merger Teknologföreningen was a student corporation of the Helsinki University of Technology. Therefore the majority of the members are students of engineering or architecture.

Teknologföreningen was founded in 1872. It was the predecessor of the student union of the Helsinki University of Technology. It is also older than any other student organization at the Aalto University. Teknologföreningen's primary purpose is to unite students interested in speaking the Swedish language and to guarantee equal rights to Swedish-speaking students at the bilingual Aalto University.

Teknologföreningen has its own peculiar building from 1966, named Urdsgjallar — a building that resembles the shape of a drinking horn seen from an aerial perspective, that according to legend has no two perpendicular walls. It was designed by Kurt Moberg, and it is a well-known example of Brutalist architecture in Finland. The name of the building derives from Gjallarhorn of norse mythology. The building hosts a lunch restaurant for students as well as rooms intended for work and recreational purposes. The building also hosts a semicircular sauna called "Pi" with a radius of 3.14 meters. — In 2020 it was decided to tear down the building because it is in poor condition.

References

Student nations in Greater Helsinki